The 1985 Chico State Wildcats football team represented California State University, Chico as a member of the Northern California Athletic Conference (NCAC) during the 1985 NCAA Division II football season. Led by second-year head coach Mike Bellotti, Chico State compiled an overall record of 4–4–1 with a mark of 3–1–1 in conference play, placing second in the NCAC. The team outscored its opponents 202 to 201 for the season. The Wildcats played home games at University Stadium in Chico, California.

Schedule

References

Chico State
Chico State Wildcats football seasons
Chico State Wildcats football